Liz Gunner is an academic who specializes in South African literature and culture, and particularly radio. She is a visiting research professor at the University of Johannesburg and a professorial research associate at the School of Oriental and African Studies of the University of London (SOAS). She has published on African literature and run workshops all over England. Her Radio Soundings: South Africa and the Black Modern was published by Cambridge University Press in 2019.

Background 
Born in Sri Lanka, Gunner taught African literature for many years at SOAS, University of London, before going to work in South Africa.

Bibliography

Monographs
Radio Soundings: South Africa and the Black Modern (Cambridge University Press, 2019)
A Handbook for Teaching African Literature (Heinemann, 1984)

Edited collections
Radio in Africa: Publics, cultures, communities (with Dina Ligaga and Dumisano Moyo; Wits UP, 2011)
Power, Marginality and African Oral Literature (with Graham Furniss, 2008)

References

Academics of SOAS University of London
Academic staff of the University of Johannesburg
Women academics
Living people
Year of birth missing (living people)